Abdur Rauf (11 November 1933 – 27 February 2015) was a commander of the Bangladesh Navy, and a politician. He served as a member of the presidium of the People's Forum. He was one of the accused in the Agartala conspiracy case filed in 1986. In 2011, the Bangla Academy awarded him an honorary fellowship. For his special contribution in the war of liberation, the government of Bangladesh posthumously awarded him the Independence Day Award in 2020.

Early life 
Rauf was born on 11 November 1933 in Bhairab. His father, Abdul Latif, was chairman of the local municipality. He was the Sports Secretary of Dhaka College Students 'Parliament in 1951–52, General Secretary of Comilla Victoria College Students' Parliament in 1953-54 and General Secretary of Fazlul Haque Hall of University of Dhaka in 1955–56.

Career 
Rauf joined the Pakistan Navy in 1962. He was arrested in 1966 for being involved in the Independent Bangladesh Movement while on duty. He spent 14 months in jail with Sheikh Mujibur Rahman in the Agartala conspiracy case. He was later released in 1969 after a mass uprising. Then he was appointed as the principal of Narsingdi College. He was an important organizer of the Bangladesh Liberation war. He was one of the members of the three-member board of directors of the special guerrilla force comprising youths of NAP and student unions led by Mozaffar Ahmed. He joined the Bangladesh Navy in August 1972 and was promoted to the rank of Commander in 1973. After the Assassination of Sheikh Mujibur Rahman in 1975, he was imprisoned. He was released in 1986. He founded Gano Forum with Kamal Hossain in 1993 and was a member of the presidium of Gana Forum till his death.

Death 
Rauf died on 26 February 2015 at the Combined Military Hospital,  Dhaka, Bangladesh.

Awards 

 Bangla Academy Fellowship 2011
 Independence Day Award 2020

References 

1933 births
2015 deaths
People from Kishoreganj District
Comilla Victoria Government College alumni
Dhaka College alumni
University of Dhaka alumni
Honorary Fellows of Bangla Academy
Recipients of the Independence Day Award